Charles Roden Filgate (16 October 1849 – 1 September 1930) was an Irish amateur cricketer who played first-class cricket from 1869 to 1877 for Gloucestershire and Marylebone Cricket Club (MCC), where he was a member.  Filgate represented Ireland in three matches between 1868 and 1871.  He was a right-handed batsman who made 25 first-class career appearances. He scored 563 runs with a highest score of 93 and held 18 catches.

Filgate was the sixth and youngest son of William Filgate of Lissrenny (1781-1875), J.P., by his wife Sophia Juliana Penelope (1807-1866), eldest daughter of the Count De Salis. He married Clare, daughter of William Cooper, on 27 February 1906. He was educated at Cheltenham College and the Inner Temple (1869), and was called to the Bar in 1872, and became a member of the Oxford Circuit.
A practising Barrister-at-Law, he lived for sometime at The Terrace, Matlock Bank, Derbyshire, England, and had two children:
William Alexander Jerome Filgate (12 Apr 1908-)
Margaret Penelope Filgate (21 Jan 1910-)

Some of his family

References

Irish cricketers
Gloucestershire cricketers
Marylebone Cricket Club cricketers
1849 births
1930 deaths
People educated at Cheltenham College